2013 China Open may refer to:

 2013 China Open (curling), a curling tournament 
 2013 China Open (snooker), a snooker tournament
 2013 China Open (tennis), a tennis tournament
 2013 China Open Super Series Premier, an edition of the China Open badminton tournament